The following is a timeline of the history of the city of Badajoz, Spain.

Prior to 20th century

 1031 - Badaljoz becomes capital of the Moorish Taifa of Badajoz.
 1168 - Portuguese in power.
 1169 -  (tower) built in the Alcazaba of Badajoz.
 1229 - Alfonso IX of León in power.
 1230 - Roman Catholic diocese of Badajoz established.
 1270 - Badajoz Cathedral consecrated.
 1460 -  (bridge) built.
 1509 - Birth of Luis de Morales, became a painter.
 1563 - Iglesia de Santo Domingo (church) built.(es)
 1597 -  (bridge) repaired.
 1658 - Siege of Badajoz (1658) by Portuguese forces.
 1705 - Besieged by the Allies in the War of the Spanish Succession.
 1767 - Birth of Manuel de Godoy, duke of Alcúdia, became First Secretary of State of Spain twice.
 1811
 19 February: Battle of the Gebora fought near Badajoz.
 April–June: Second Siege of Badajoz (1811) by Portuguese and British forces.
 1812 - March–April: Siege of Badajoz (1812) by Portuguese and British forces.
 1833
 Sociedad Económica de Amigos del País de Badajoz established.
  (bridge) re-built.
 1839 -  (cemetery) established.
 1842 - Population: 11,715.
 1862 - El Avisador de Badajoz newspaper begins publication.
 1863 - Badajoz Railway Station begins operating.
 1867 -  (museum) established.
 1889 -  (bank) founded.
 1900 - Population: 30,899.

20th century

 1903 - Castelar Park established.
 1920 -  (museum) opens.
 1933 -  newspaper begins publication.
 1936
 14 August: Battle of Badajoz (1936).
 August: Massacre of Badajoz.
 1940 - Population: 55,869.
 1944 -  (archives) established.
 1970 - Population: 101,710.
 1973 - University of Extremadura established.
 1990 - Badajoz Airport terminal opens.
 1994 -  (bridge) built.
 1995 - Museo Extremeño e Iberoamericano de Arte Contemporáneo (museum) opens.

21st century
 2002 -  newspaper begins publication.
 2006 -  (convention centre) opens.
 2011
  (hi-rise) built.
 Population: 151,214.
 2013 -  becomes mayor.

See also

References

This article incorporates information from the Spanish Wikipedia.

Bibliography

External links

 Items related to Badajoz, various dates (via Europeana)

.
History of Extremadura
Badajoz